Carl Fabian Langenskiöld,  also known as Carl Fabian Theodor Langenskiöld (17 November 1810 – 29 June 1863) was a Finnish politician and a member of the Senate of Finland from 1857 to 1863.

Langenskiöld is called the father of the finnish mark, which was the currency of Finland from 1860 to 2002.

Early life
Langenskiöld was born in Sääksmäki, a village and former municipality in Finland on 17 November 1810. He then went to Odert Henrik Gripenberg's internship school and got a private certificate there at Turku in 1825.

References

External links
 LANGENSKIÖLD, Fabian Biografiskt lexikon för Finland 
 FIM | Finnish Markka | OAN Information about Finnish Markka

Finnish politicians
Finnish senators
1810 births
1863 deaths